Arlinda Dudaj (born 7 October 1977, in Tirana) is an Albanian publisher who currently serves as the president of "Dudaj" Publishing House. She is the co-founder of the "Albanian Book Association" along with Ardian Klosi and presently serves as the organization's chairwoman.

References

Living people
Albanian publishers (people)
People from Tirana
Publishers from Kavajë
1977 births